Cornerstone, formerly known as Cornerstone Community Care, is a Scottish charity and social enterprise that provides support and care to children, adults and older adults living a range of long-term conditions and challenges. These include autism, learning and physical disabilities, dementia and mental health problems. It was founded in 1980 in Aberdeen and, since obtaining charitable status in 1981[1], Cornerstone has grown to become one of the largest charities in Scotland[2].

History 
Nicholas (Nick) Baxter formed Cornerstone in 1980 when he brought together a group of parents and professionals who were concerned about the lack and quality of services available to people with learning disabilities and their families. They wanted to provide community based support for people with special needs and Cornerstone's aim became 'to enable people we support to enjoy a valued life'.

Cornerstone opened its first residential service in 1982. By 2007 the charity was providing help in around 150 locations for almost 1,300 children, young people and adults with learning disabilities and other special needs.[3] The 2017/2018 annual review reports 2,400 children and adults being supported.[4]

Baxter retired as Cornerstone's Chief Executive in May 2008. He died in May 2013.Hazel Brown is the current Chief Executive.

In 2017 the charity restructured, using some of the principles of the Dutch model Buurtzorg. It devolved decision-making and accountability to ten branches that cover most of the country. It reduced layers of management and has set out on a mission to up-skill and empower local staff to become self-organised local care and support teams (LCAST). There are now eleven branches:

 Aberdeen North & Aberdeenshire
 Aberdeen South & Aberdeenshire
 Argyll & Bute & West Dunbartonshire (Community Support)
 Argyll & Bute & West Dunbartonshire (Housing Support)
 Ayrshire
 Fife, Lothian, Edinburgh & Scottish Borders
 Glasgow & East Dunbartonshire
 Moray
 North Lanarkshire (Community Support)
 North Lanarkshire (Housing Support)
 Perth, Dundee & Angus

See also
Health and Social Care Partnerships
Social care in Scotland
Office of the Scottish Charity Regulator
SSSC
 Care Inspectorate (Scotland)
Social care in Scotland

References 
 Office of the Scottish Charity Regulator (OSCR) https://www.oscr.org.uk/about-charities/search-the-register/charity-details?number=4780
 https://www.oscr.org.uk/about-charities/search-the-register/the-300-highest-income-charities/ # © Crown Copyright and database right [2019]. Contains information from the Scottish Charity Register supplied by the Office of the Scottish Charity Regulator and licensed under the Open Government Licence v.2.0. 
 Cornerstone website, 2007
 https://www.cornerstone.org.uk/assets/000/000/182/Annual_Review_2017-18_original.pdf?1541676463
 https://www.theguardian.com/theguardian/2013/may/05/nick-baxter-obituary

External links
 

Charities based in Aberdeen
Organisations based in Glasgow
Organisations based in Dundee
Children's charities based in Scotland
1980 establishments in Scotland
Charities for disabled people based in Scotland
Social care in Scotland
Non-profit organisations based in Scotland